Bahía Drake is a district of the Osa canton, in the Puntarenas province of Costa Rica.

History 
Bahía Drake was created on 3 August 2012 by Acuerdo Ejecutivo N° 36-2012-MGP.

Geography 
Bahía Drake has an area of  km² and an elevation of  metres.

Demographics 

For the 2011 census, Bahía Drake had not been created, therefore census data will be available until 2021.

References 

Districts of Puntarenas Province
Populated places in Puntarenas Province